Mark Alan Siegel (born May 20, 1944) is an American politician who served in the New York State Assembly from the 66th district from 1975 to 1990. He ran for the Florida House of Representatives in 2006, but came in third place in the Democratic primary. He served as Chair of the Palm Beach County Democratic Party from December 2008 to September 2012.

References

1944 births
Living people
Democratic Party members of the New York State Assembly